Watch is a 2001 documentary written, directed and produced by environmental activist Briana Waters, who is serving a six-year sentence for charges relating to the University of Washington firebombing incident. The film portrays the cooperation between residents of the Washington logging town, Randle, and Cascadia Defense Network activists attempting to stop the clearcutting of old growth trees on Watch mountain (part of the Cascade Mountain range) and along the nearby Fossil Creek. The film served as Waters' senior project at Evergreen State College.

Synopsis
Residents of the town, in addition to young activists, express concern that Plum Creek logging operations will destroy old growth forest in the area and damage the local eco-system of the creek, resulting in mudslides.

Watch documents the responses of residents of Randle as well as the activists who come to engage in tree sitting as a means of deterring Plum Creek logging.  Footage includes two town meetings addressing the issue of the logging, protests outside of and inside of Plum Creek's offices in Seattle, confrontations with police, and acts of support by the Cowlitz tribe.

In November 1999, Plum Creek agrees to remove the disputed areas from the draft of their land exchange agreement, and the finalized exchange grants them rights to only  of land, primarily east of Cascades, with Watch mountain and Fossil Creek excluded from the deal.  The film ends with the activists tearing down their own platforms in the old growth canopy, and gathering celebrate their victory.

References

External links
 
 Support Briana - A website made by supporters of Waters with regards to her imprisonment. Copies of the documentary may be ordered through this site.

2001 films
2001 in the environment
2001 documentary films
Documentary films about forests and trees
American documentary films
Films about activists
2000s English-language films
2000s American films